Sonja Manzenreiter (born 18 July 1975) is an Austrian luger who competed from 1997 to 2006. She won the bronze medal in the mixed team event at the 2003 FIL World Luge Championships in Sigulda, Latvia.

Competing in three Winter Olympics, Manzenreiter also finished seventh in the women's singles event at Salt Lake City in 2002.

References
1998 luge women's singles results
FIL-Luge profile
Hickok sports information on World champions in luge and skeleton.

External links
 
 
 

1975 births
Living people
Austrian female lugers
Olympic lugers of Austria
Lugers at the 1998 Winter Olympics
Lugers at the 2002 Winter Olympics
Lugers at the 2006 Winter Olympics